"Timebomb" is a 2007 single by American musician Beck. On August 21, 2007, the single was made available on iTunes. It was released on 12" vinyl on November 2, 2007. A one-track promo-only CD was also produced. "Timebomb" was nominated for the Grammy Award for Best Solo Rock Vocal Performance.

A post from Beck's official website said that it would be "a song for bonfires, blackouts and the last hurrah of summer". It combines aspects of electronica, experimental rock, and alternative rock. In 2006 and 2007, the song was played live a number of times.

The post on Beck's website said that the cover art "features Ryan in the knitted Aztec Bird costume, some of you may have seen him dancing in on stage the past few years."

Reception
Critical reaction was generally positive. Nate Chinen of The New York Times described the song as "unmistakably playful" but said that "direness lurks beneath the spangles". Conversely, Richard Cromelin of the Los Angeles Times said that the track was "catchy, dynamic, and fun". Rolling Stone magazine said "...house-party DJ's...cue up Beck's New banger - which gets the party started."

Track listing
 "Timebomb" – 2:50
 "Timebomb" (Instrumental) – 2:50

Personnel
 Beck Hansen – hand claps, synthesizer, vocals
 Brian LeBarton – drum machine, guitar, hand claps, synthesizer, backing vocals
 Brianna Bell – backing vocals
 Elisha Skorman – backing vocals
 Kimi Reichenberg – backing vocals
 Sage Mears – backing vocals
 Tiffani Fest – backing vocals
Technical
 Darrell Thorp – engineering
 Drew Brown – engineering
 Beck Hansen – production
 Bob Ludwig – mastering
 Ken Andrews – mixing

References

External links
 Official Beck website
 Information on "Timebomb" at WhiskeyClone.Net

2007 singles
Beck songs
Songs written by Beck
2007 songs
Interscope Records singles
Songs written by John King (record producer)
Songs written by Michael Simpson (producer)